Pshevorsk is a small Hasidic movement based in Antwerp, Belgium, led by the Leiser rabbinical dynasty, originating in the Polish town of Przeworsk.

History

The first Rebbe, Moshe Yitzchak, was a son of Rabbi Naftoli Elimelech, son of Rabbi Avrohom of Gorlice, who was a great grandson of Elimelech of Lizhensk. After his marriage, he settled in Przeworsk, Poland. He survived the Holocaust, and moved to Paris. In 1956, he settled in Antwerp, where he lived until he died on Yom Kippur in 1976 (year 5737 in the Hebrew calendar). His son-in-law, Rebbe Yaakov Leiser, succeeded him. Leiser served as Pshevorsker Rebbe until 1998, when he died and was succeeded by his son Leibish Leiser, the current Rebbe of Pshevorsk.

Yaakov Leiser is buried in Putte, Netherlands, because a Belgian law makes it possible to re-use or build on top of gravesites. As such, the Jews of Antwerp have traditionally been buried in Putte, where the sanctity of gravesites is assured.

Activities
On Jewish holidays, such as Rosh Hashanah ("new year"), hundreds of Pshevorsker Hasidim, and also other Hasidim such as Vizhnitz and Satmar, come to Antwerp to pray at the Pshevorsker prayer gatherings, which are usually held in a large wedding hall. The Pshevorsker's headquarters is the beis midrash (or, "study hall") known as Beis Yitzchok, at Mercatorstraat 56 in Antwerp.

There are organized groups of Pshevorsk Hasidim in London and also in Manchester, and groups in the United States and Israel. A shul was built in London, where the Rebbe's son serves as the Rav.
There is a shul in Jerusalem too, which was led by the Rebbe's son Shulem, until he left religion and became off the derech.

Ideology
Ideologically, Pshevorsk is a combination of four different offshoots of Tsanz. R' Itzik'l was a close student of the Satmar Rebbe (Rabbi Yoel Teitelbaum). The current Rebbe continues the close ties with Satmar, and agrees with their anti-Zionist views.

Lineage
Rebbe Moshe Yitzchak (Reb Itzikl) Gevirzman of Pshevorsk (1881–1976)
Rebbe Yaakov (Reb Yankele) Leiser of Pshevorsk (1907–1998), son-in-law of Reb Itzikl
Rebbe Leibish Leiser of Pshevorsk, present Pshevorsker Rebbe, son of Reb Yankele

See also
Jewish Community of Antwerp

Hasidic dynasties
Hasidic Judaism in Europe
Judaism in Antwerp
Hasidic anti-Zionism